Hautot-sur-Seine (literally Hautot on Seine) is a commune in the Seine-Maritime department in the Normandy region in north-western France.

Heraldry

Geography

Population

Places of interest

 The church of Saint-Antoine-et-Saint-Thibauld, dating from the fifteenth century.
 Three nineteenth century châteaux.

See also
Communes of the Seine-Maritime department

References

External links

Official website of the village 
Forum website of the village 

Communes of Seine-Maritime